Major-General Algernon Lee Ransome  (29 August 1883 – 1969) was a British Army officer.

Military career
Algernon Lee Ransome was born in the United States and was privately educated before going to the United Kingdom where, after attending and later graduating from the Royal Military College, Sandhurst, he was commissioned into the Dorsetshire Regiment on 19 December 1903. He spent the first few years of his military career serving his regiment's first battalion.

He went on to serve with distinction during the First World War. He became commanding officer of the 7th (Service) Battalion, Buffs (Royal East Kent Regiment) in 1916 and commanded it during the German spring offensive in March 1918. He went on to command the 170th (2/1st North Lancashire) Brigade from September 1918 until the Armistice of 11 November 1918, which ended the war. During the war he was awarded the Distinguished Service Order (DSO) with bar, the Military Cross in 1915, and was mentioned in dispatches six times and rose from the rank of captain to brigadier-general.

As a Regular Army officer, he remained in the army during the interwar period, attending the Staff College, Camberley in the first post-war course in 1919. He then served as a staff officer with Aldershot Command and then at the War Office from 1920−1925. After marrying in 1927 he served in Australia at the Royal Military College, Duntroon as an instructor from 1927−1928 before returning to England and Aldershot Command, this time as an Assistant Adjutant General, holding this post from 1931 until 1933.

After that, he became commander of the 2nd Indian Infantry Brigade from 1933 to 1935 and retired from the army in 1938. He was recalled to service to become General Officer Commanding (GOC) of the newly raised 46th Infantry Division in October 1939, a month after the beginning of the Second World War, before retiring again in December 1939. He later commanded the 10th (Romsey) Battalion of the Hampshire Home Guard from 1942 to 1944 and his final years were spent in Romsey.

References

Bibliography

External links
Generals of World War II

1883 births
1969 deaths
British Army major generals
British Army generals of World War II
Companions of the Order of the Bath
Companions of the Distinguished Service Order
Recipients of the Military Cross
Dorset Regiment officers
British Army generals of World War I
Graduates of the Royal Military College, Sandhurst
Graduates of the Staff College, Camberley
British Home Guard officers
American emigrants to the United Kingdom